Zbaraz is a locality within the Rural Municipality of Fisher in the Interlake Region of central Manitoba, Canada.  It is located approximately 126 kilometers (78 miles) north-west of Winnipeg.

References 

Localities in Manitoba
Ukrainian-Canadian culture in Manitoba